Zgornja Sorica is a village in the Municipality of Železniki in the Upper Carniola region of Slovenia.

Zgornja Sorica together with neighbouring Spodnja Sorica (Unterzarz), like Nemški Rovt (Deutschgereuth) in Bohinj and Rut (Deutschruth), is part of a former German language island in a remote valley of the Julian Alps. In medieval times, the Carniolan estates around Škofja Loka were held by the Bavarian Bishops of Freising, who from about 1200 had the Zarz region settled with peasants descending from their territory in the Upper Puster Valley (around Innichen) in Tyrol. The local Southern Bavarian dialect had strong similarities to the dialect spoken in the Puster Valley; however, it died out by the early 20th century.

References

External links

Zgornja Sorica at Geopedia

Populated places in the Municipality of Železniki